There Is a Time is Liza Minnelli's third solo studio album, her last with Capitol Records, released on November 21, 1966. It contained her interpretations of eleven pop standards. It was recorded at Capitol Records' New York studio at 151 West 46th Street.

Reception

Stereo Review named There Is a Time album of the year..

Track listing

Side one
"There Is a Time (Le Temps)" (Gene Lees, Charles Aznavour, Jeff Davis)
"I (Who Have Nothing)" (Jerry Leiber, Mike Stoller, Mogol, Carlo Donida)
"M'Lord" (Marguerite Monnot, Georges Moustaki)
"Watch What Happens ("Husband theme" from The Umbrellas of Cherbourg)" (Jacques Demy, Norman Gimbel, Michel Legrand)
"One of Those Songs" (Gerard Calvi, Will Holt)
"Days of the Waltz" (Jacques Brel, Will Holt)

Side two
"Ay Marieke" (Jacques Brel, Gérard Jouannest)
"Love at Last You Have Found Me (J'en Deduis Que Je T'aime)" (Charles Aznavour, Johnny Worth)
"I'll Build a Stairway to Paradise" (Buddy DeSylva, George Gershwin, Ira Gershwin)
"See the Old Man" (John Kander, Fred Ebb)
"The Parisians" (Alan Jay Lerner, Frederick Loewe)

Personnel
Produced by Marvin Holtzman
Arranged and conducted by Ray Ellis

References

Liza Minnelli: When It Comes Down To It.......1968–1977 liner notes by Glenn A. Baker, 2003
Liza Minnelli: The Complete A&M Recordings liner notes by Scott Schechter, 2008
Liza Minnelli: The Complete Capitol Collection liner notes by Scott Schechter, 2006

Liza Minnelli albums
1966 albums
Capitol Records albums
Albums arranged by Ray Ellis
Albums conducted by Ray Ellis